In political science, political alienation refers to an individual citizen's relatively enduring sense of estrangement from, or rejection of, the prevailing political system. In representative democracies, this often leads to voter apathy – the abstention from voting in that government's elections.

Content and categories
Political alienation is not to be confused with voter apathy, which describes a person's indifference to voting and/or the voting process. Politically, alienated people feel compelled to vote but are restricted by their sense of insignificance to the system. They feel that they are underrepresented or not represented at all by those running for office; their best interest or concerns are not regarded.

Political alienation falls into two broad categories: political incapability and political discontentment. In the first instance, alienation is forced upon the individual by their environment, whereas in the second case it is voluntarily chosen by them.

There are at least five expressions of political alienation:
Political powerlessness. An individual's feeling that they cannot affect the actions of the government.
Political meaninglessness. An individual's perception that political decisions are unclear and unpredictable.
Political normlessness. An individual's perception that norms or rules intended to govern political relations are broken down, and that departures from prescribed behavior are common.
Political isolation. An individual's rejection of political norms and goals that are widely held and shared by other members of a society.
Political disappointment. An individual's disinterest to a political decision or participation because of the ruling class bad behaviors, such as, leaders having scandals by doing shameful things.

Political alienation overlaps with anti-politics, and there are likely causal relationships between the two concepts. Alienation differs from anti-political sentiment in that the latter tends to focus on negative assessments of politicians and political elites, whereas alienation may encompasses dissatisfaction with other elements of a political system, such as the electoral system, party system, or the idea of democratic society.

Political alienation is adversely related to political efficacy.
The most common electoral consequences of political alienation are abstention and protest voting.

In the current election system in the United States, many voters feel that their vote will not matter in their state if they do not agree with the majority of the population. Voters who usually vote Democrat in the general election, but live in a primarily Republican state, often feel less inclined to vote. The same goes for Republicans who live in a primarily Democratic state. In these situations, voters feel as if their vote no longer matters in the electoral college.

2016 United States presidential election 
The 2016 United States presidential election saw political alienation as one of the central issues of the campaign. Both Donald Trump and Hillary Clinton made appeals to the working class in Midwestern states by pointing out that they feel as if their votes carried little weight and said communities had been abandoned by past candidates. Trump and Clinton did the same with Black and Latino voters in urban areas, voicing concerns with political alienation in the past.

The voter turnout in the presidential election that year is estimated to have been 55.5% of the eligible voting population. This election also saw an increase in voters in swing states and a decrease in voters living in "safe" states.

Possible solutions
Belgian historian David van Reybrouck describes in his book Against elections the current problems in Western democracy as the democratic fatigue syndrome. As a solution for the alienation of voters from parties and politicians he advocates a deliberative democracy based on sortition.

See also

References

External links 

Lesson Plan for The Encyclopedia of Democracy - Congressional Quarterly Books: Political alienation

Political terminology
Political science